Bruce Kerr (born 3 May 1996) is a South African cricketer. He was included in KwaZulu-Natal's squad for the 2016 Africa T20 Cup. He made his first-class debut for KwaZulu-Natal in the 2016–17 Sunfoil 3-Day Cup on 17 November 2016.

References

External links
 

1996 births
Living people
South African cricketers
KwaZulu-Natal cricketers
Cricketers from Johannesburg